Grant County High School is a public high school serving the ninth through twelfth grades in Grant County, Kentucky, USA. It is one of seven schools and the only high school in the Grant County Schools district.

School information
The School was formed in 1954 as the result of the merger of the county's four previous high schools Corinth, Mason, Dry Ridge, and Crittenden. The current Grant County High School building was dedicated in 1998. Computer terminals are available in each classroom. Three computer labs are available for student use along with a media center with Internet access.

The student-teacher ratio is 18, which exceeds the state average of 15. Spending per pupil is $6,639, less than the state average of $7,639.

Grading scale

A = 93-100
B = 85-92
C = 75-84
D = 68-74
F = 0-67

Bell schedule

The GCHS schedule consist of five roughly 65 minute long class periods, along with a 25 minute enrichment time that is used for various prep courses depending on a students grades and test proficiency, the worthiness of this time is a source of debate for many students and faculty.

Extracurricular activities

Athletics

Archery
Baseball
Boys' basketball
Girls' basketball
Bass fishing
Cheerleading 
Cross country
Football 
Golf 
Marching Band
Boys' soccer 
Girls' soccer 
Softball
Tennis 
Track and field
Volleyball 
Wrestling

Clubs and organizations
Students participate in several clubs and organizations, including:

Future Business Leaders of America (FBLA)
Future Farmers of America (FFA)
Future, Career, and Community Leaders of America (FCCLA) Formerly Future Homemakers of America (FHA)
National Honor Society (NHS)
National English Honor Society (NEHS)
Mu Alpha Theta 
National Art Honor Society (NAHS)
Science National Honor Society (SNHS)
Junior Reserve Officers' Training Corps (JROTC)
Academic Team
Future Problem Solving (FPS)
Technology Student Association (TSA) 
TSA Vex robotics 
Skills USA
Heath Occupations Students of America (HOSA)
Fellowship of Christian Athletes (FCA)
Student Council
Pep Club
Band

Performance
The high school is accredited by Southern Association of Colleges and Schools. Over forty percent of the student population is classified as "Academic Achievers," who achieve at high levels, attend school regularly, and exhibit exemplary behavior.  There was once a program for the Academic Achievers, but that program has since been done away with. In 2006-2007 students took Advanced Placement (AP) examinations in 11 of the 37 course areas. As of the 2017-2018 school year, however, there are only 4 AP course available to the student. To some degree this is because of the administration encouraging dual credit college classes over AP.

References

External links
Grant County High School
Grant County Schools district

Schools in Grant County, Kentucky
Public high schools in Kentucky